Yılmaz Basravi (born 13 March 2000) is a Turkish professional footballer who plays as a winger for Nazilli Belediyespor on loan from Göztepe.

Career
Basravi is a youth product of the academies of Elitspor, Balçovas, and Göztepe. On 28 October 2020, he signed his first professional contract with Göztepe. He made his professional debut with Göztepe in a 5–3 Süper Lig loss to Gençlerbirliği on 11 May 2021.

References

External links

2000 births
People from Kızıltepe
Living people
Turkish footballers
Association football wingers
Göztepe S.K. footballers
Tarsus Idman Yurdu footballers
Nazilli Belediyespor footballers
Süper Lig players
TFF Second League players